Antoni Kraszewski (1797-1870) was a Polish politician and parliamentarian.  He was a member of the Polish National Committee (1848).

References 

 Witold Jakóbczyk, Przetrwać na Wartą 1815-1914, Dzieje narodu i państwa polskiego, vol. III-55, Krajowa Agencja Wydawnicza, Warszawa 1989

People from the Grand Duchy of Posen
Polish politicians
1797 births
1870 deaths